KPQX (92.5 FM) is a radio station licensed to serve Havre, Montana.  The station is owned by New Media Broadcasters Inc. It airs a country music format. The broadcast studios are located north of town, at 2210 31st Street North. This facility is shared with its sister stations. The transmitter site is south of Harve, near Baldy Mountain.

KPQX was the first FM radio station in Montana to broadcast pure digital HD Radio in the summer 2005. The HD2 subchannel broadcasts a classic country format.

The station was assigned the KPQX call letters by the Federal Communications Commission. Notable former on-air personalities include Rick Rydell.

References

External links
KPQX official website
New Media Broadcasters Inc.

PQX
Country radio stations in the United States
Hill County, Montana